Upper caste may be a relative or an absolute term. It may refer to:

 A caste other than a scheduled caste.
 Ritual status in the Varna system, generally referring to the twice-born (dvija) varnas
 Other Backward Class castes are considered upper caste than Dalits.
 Forward castes in the context of politics and reservation